The World Series is the annual championship series of Major League Baseball (MLB) in the United States and Canada, contested since 1903 between the champion teams of the American League (AL) and the National League (NL). The winner of the World Series championship is determined through a best-of-seven playoff, and the winning team is awarded the Commissioner's Trophy.

Prior to the AL and NL being split into divisions in 1969, the team with the best regular-season win–loss record in each league automatically clinched its league's pennant and advanced to the World Series, barring the rare tie necessitating a pennant playoff. Since then each league has conducted a League Championship Series (ALCS and NLCS) preceding the World Series to determine which teams will advance, while those series have been preceded in turn by Division Series (ALDS and NLDS) since 1995, and Wild Card games or series in each league since 2012. Until 2002, home-field advantage in the World Series alternated from year to year between the AL and NL. From 2003 to 2016, home-field advantage was given to the league that won that year's All-Star Game. Starting in 2017, home-field advantage was awarded to the league champion team with the better regular-season win–loss record. The World Series has been contested 118 times as of 2022, with the AL winning 67 and the NL winning 51.

Precursors to the modern World Series (1857–1902)

The original World Series 
Until the formation of the American Association in 1882 as a second major league, the National Association of Professional Base Ball Players (1871–1875) and then the National League (founded 1876) represented the top level of organized baseball in the United States. All championships were awarded to the team with the best record at the end of the season, without a postseason series being played. From 1884 to 1890, the National League and the American Association faced each other in a series of games at the end of the season to determine an overall champion. These series were disorganized in comparison to the modern World Series, with the terms arranged through negotiation of the owners of the championship teams beforehand. The number of games played ranged from as few as three in 1884 (Providence defeated New York three games to zero), to a high of fifteen in 1887 (Detroit beat St. Louis ten games to five). Both the 1885 and 1890 Series ended in ties, each team having won three games with one tie game.

The series was promoted and referred to as "The Championship of the United States", "World's Championship Series", or "World's Series" for short.
In his book Krakatoa: The Day the World Exploded: August 27, 1883, Simon Winchester mentions in passing that the World Series was named for the New York World newspaper, but this view is disputed.

The 19th-century competitions are, however, not officially recognized as part of World Series history by Major League Baseball, as it considers 19th-century baseball to be a prologue to the modern baseball era. Until about 1960, some sources treated the 19th-century Series on an equal basis with the post-19th-century series. After about 1930, however, many authorities list the start of the World Series in 1903 and discuss the earlier contests separately.
(For example, the 1929 World Almanac and Book of Facts lists "Baseball World's Championships 1884–1928" in a single table, but the 1943 edition lists "Baseball World's Championships 1903–1942".)

In more recent times, the series has sometimes been nicknamed the Fall Classic, as it is played during the fall season in North America.

1892–1900: "The Monopoly Years" 
Following the collapse of the American Association after the 1891 season, the National League was again the only major league. The league championship was awarded in 1892 by a playoff between split season champions. This scheme was abandoned after one season. Beginning in 1893—and continuing until divisional play was introduced in 1969—the pennant was awarded to the first-place club in the standings at the end of the season. For four seasons, 1894–1897, the league champions played the runners-up in the postseason championship series called the Temple Cup. A second attempt at this format was the Chronicle-Telegraph Cup series, which was played only once, in 1900.

In 1901, the American League was formed as a second major league. No championship series were played in 1901 or 1902 as the National and American Leagues fought each other for business supremacy (in 1902, the top teams instead opted to compete in a football championship).

Modern World Series (1903–present)

First attempt 

After two years of bitter competition and player raiding, the National and American Leagues made peace and, as part of the accord, several pairs of teams squared off for interleague exhibition games following the 1903 season. These series were arranged by the participating clubs, as the 1880s World's Series matches had been. One of them, a best-of nine affair matching that year's pennant winners – the Pittsburgh Pirates of the NL and Boston Americans (later known as the Red Sox) of the AL – has come to be regarded as the 1903 World Series. It had been arranged well in advance by the two club owners, as both teams were league leaders by large margins. 

Boston upset Pittsburgh by five games to three, winning with pitching depth behind Cy Young and Bill Dinneen and with the support of the band of Royal Rooters. The Series brought much civic pride to Boston and proved the new American League could beat the Nationals.

Boycott of 1904 

The 1904 Series, if it had been held, would have been between the AL's Boston Americans (Boston Red Sox) and the NL's New York Giants (now the San Francisco Giants). At that point there was no governing body for the World Series nor any requirement that a Series be played. Thus the Giants' owner John T. Brush refused to allow his team to participate in such an event, citing the "inferiority" of the upstart American League. John McGraw, the Giants' manager, even went so far as to say that his Giants were already "world champions" since they were the champions of the "only real major league". 

At the time of the announcement, their new cross-town rivals, the New York Highlanders (now the New York Yankees), were leading the AL, and the prospect of facing the Highlanders did not please Giants management. Boston won on the last day of the season, and the leagues had previously agreed to hold a World's Championship Series in 1904, but it was not binding, and Brush stuck to his original decision. In addition to political reasons, Brush also factually cited the lack of rules under which money would be split, where games would be played, and how they would be operated and staffed.

During the winter of 1904–1905, however, feeling the sting of press criticism, Brush had a change of heart and proposed what came to be known as the "Brush Rules", under which the series were played subsequently.  One rule was that player shares would come from a portion of the gate receipts for the first four games only. This was to discourage teams from fixing early games in order to prolong the series and make more money. Receipts for later games was split among the two clubs and the National Commission, the governing body for the sport, which was able to cover much of its annual operating expense from World Series revenue.  Most importantly, the now-official and compulsory World Series matches were operated strictly by the National Commission itself, not by the participating clubs.

With the new rules in place and the National Commission in control, McGraw's Giants made it to the 1905 Series and beat the Philadelphia Athletics four games to one. Since then the Series has been held every year except 1994, when it was canceled due to a players' strike. The name of the event, initially known as the World's Championship Series, was gradually shortened in common usage to "World's Series" and, by the 1930s, to "World Series".

The list of postseason rules evolved over time. From 1919 to 1921, the  best-of-nine format first used in 1903 was employed. In 1925, Brooklyn owner Charles Ebbets persuaded others to adopt as a permanent rule the 2–3–2 home game pattern first used in 1924. Previously, the pattern had been to alternate by game or to make another arrangement convenient to both clubs. The 2–3–2 pattern has been used ever since save for the 1943 and 1945 World Series, which followed a 3–4 pattern due to World War II travel restrictions; in 1944, the normal pattern was followed because both teams were based in the same home ballpark.

1919 Black Sox Scandal 

Gambling and game-fixing had been a problem in professional baseball from the beginning; star pitcher Jim Devlin was banned for life in 1877 when the National League was just two years old. Baseball's gambling problems came to a head in 1919, when eight players of the Chicago White Sox were alleged to have conspired to throw the 1919 World Series.

The Sox had won the Series in 1917 and were heavy favorites to beat the Cincinnati Reds in 1919, but first baseman Chick Gandil had other plans. Gandil, in collaboration with gambler Joseph "Sport" Sullivan, approached his teammates and got six of them to agree to throw the Series: starting pitchers Eddie Cicotte and Lefty Williams, shortstop Swede Risberg, left fielder Shoeless Joe Jackson, center fielder Happy Felsch, and utility infielder Fred McMullin. Third baseman Buck Weaver knew of the fix but declined to participate, hitting .324 for the series from 11 hits and committing no errors in the field. 

The Sox, who were promised $100,000 for cooperating, proceeded to lose the best-of-nine Series in eight games, pitching poorly, hitting poorly and making many errors. Though he took the money, Jackson insisted to his death that he played to the best of his ability in the series (he was the best hitter in the series, including having hit the series' only home run, but had markedly worse numbers in the games the White Sox lost).

During the Series, writer and humorist Ring Lardner had facetiously called the event the "World's Serious". The Series turned out to indeed have serious consequences for the sport. After rumors circulated for nearly a year, the players were suspended in September 1920.

The "Black Sox" were acquitted in a criminal conspiracy trial. However, baseball in the meantime had established the office of Commissioner in an effort to protect the game's integrity, and the first commissioner, Kenesaw Mountain Landis, banned all of the players involved, including Weaver, for life. The White Sox would not win a World Series again until 2005.

The events of the 1919 Series, segueing into the "live ball" era, marked a point in time of change of the fortunes of several teams. The two most prolific World Series winners to date, the New York Yankees and the St. Louis Cardinals, did not win their first championship until the 1920s; and three of the teams that were highly successful prior to 1920 (the Boston Red Sox, Chicago White Sox and the Chicago Cubs) went the rest of the 20th century without another World Series win. The Red Sox and White Sox finally won again in 2004 and 2005, respectively.  The Cubs had to wait over a century (until the 2016 season) for their next trophy. They did not appear in the World Series from 1945 until 2016, the longest drought of any MLB club.

New York Yankees dynasty (1920–1964) 

The New York Yankees purchased Babe Ruth’s contract from the Boston Red Sox after the 1919 season, appeared in their first World Series two years later in 1921, and became frequent participants thereafter. The 1921 World Series was the first to be broadcast on radio.  Over a period of 45 years from 1920 to 1964, the Yankees played in 29 World Series championships, winning 20.  The team's dynasty reached its apex between 1949 and 1964 when the Yankees reached the World Series 14 times in 16 years, helped by an agreement with the Kansas City Athletics, after that team moved from Philadelphia during 1954–1955 offseason, whereby the teams made several deals advantageous to the Yankees, until ended by new Athletics' owner Charles O. Finley. 

During that span, the Yankees played in all World Series except 1954 and 1959, winning nine of them.  From 1949 to 1953, the Yankees won the World Series five years in a row; from 1936 to 1939 the Yankees won four World Series Championships in a row. There are only two other occasions when a team has won at least three consecutive World Series: 1972 to 1974 by the Oakland Athletics, and 1998 to 2000 by the Yankees.

1947–1964: New York City teams dominate World Series play 

In an 18-year span from 1947 to 1964, except for 1948 and 1959, the World Series was played in New York City, featuring at least one of the three teams located in New York at the time. The Dodgers and Giants moved to California after the 1957 season, leaving the Yankees as the lone team in the city until the Mets were enfranchised in 1962.  In 1947, 1949, 1951, 1952, 1953, 1955, and 1956, both teams in the World Series were from New York, with the Yankees playing against either the Dodgers or Giants.

1958: The Dodgers and Giants move west

In 1958, the Brooklyn Dodgers and New York Giants took their long-time rivalry to the west coast, moving to Los Angeles and San Francisco, respectively, bringing Major League Baseball west of St. Louis and Kansas City.

The Dodgers were the first of the two clubs to contest a World Series on the west coast, defeating the Chicago White Sox in 1959. The 1962 Giants made the first California World Series appearance of that franchise, losing to the Yankees. The Dodgers made three World Series appearances in the 1960s: a 1963 win over the Yankees, a 1965 win over the Minnesota Twins and a 1966 loss to the Baltimore Orioles.

1969: League Championship Series 

Prior to 1969, the National League and the American League each crowned its champion (the "pennant winner") based on the best win–loss record at the end of the regular season.

A structured playoff series began in 1969 when both the National and American Leagues were reorganized into two divisions each, East and West. The two division winners within each league played each other in a best-of-five League Championship Series to determine who would advance to the World Series. In 1985, the format changed to best-of-seven.

The National League Championship Series (NLCS) and American League Championship Series (ALCS), since the expansion to best-of-seven, are always played in a 2–3–2 format: Games 1, 2, 6, and 7 are played in the stadium of the team that has home-field advantage, and Games 3, 4, and 5 are played in the stadium of the team that does not.

1970s

1971: World Series at night 
Night games were played in the major leagues beginning with the Cincinnati Reds in 1935, but the World Series remained a strictly daytime event for years thereafter. In the fifth and final game of the 1949 World Series, a Series game was finished under the lights for the first time due to encroaching darkness in the ninth inning. The first scheduled night World Series game was Game 4 of the 1971 World Series at Three Rivers Stadium.  

Afterward, World Series games were frequently scheduled at night, when television audiences were larger. Game 6 of the 1987 World Series was the last World Series game played in the daytime, indoors at the Metrodome in Minnesota. The last World Series played outdoors during the day was the final game of the 1984 series in Detroit's Tiger Stadium.

1972–1978: Threepeat, repeats, and Fisk's home run 

During this seven-year period, only three teams won the World Series: the Oakland Athletics from 1972 to 1974, Cincinnati Reds in 1975 and 1976, and New York Yankees in 1977 and 1978. This is the only time in World Series history in which three teams have won consecutive series in succession. This period was book-ended by World Championships for the Pittsburgh Pirates, in 1971 and 1979.

However, the Baltimore Orioles made three consecutive World Series appearances: 1969, losing to the "amazing" seven-year-old franchise New York Mets, 1970, beating the Reds in their first World Series appearance of the decade, and 1971, losing to the Pittsburgh Pirates, as well their 1979 appearance, when they again lost to the Pirates, and the Los Angeles Dodgers' back-to-back World Series appearances in 1977 and 1978, both losses to the New York Yankees, as well in 1974 losing against the cross-state rival Oakland Athletics.

Game 6 of the 1975 World Series is regarded by most as one of the greatest World Series games ever played. It found the Boston Red Sox winning in the 12th inning in Fenway Park, defeating the Cincinnati Reds to force a seventh and deciding game. The game is best remembered for its exciting lead changes, nail-biting turns of events, and a game-winning walk-off home run by Carlton Fisk, resulting in a 7–6 Red Sox victory.

1976: The designated hitter comes to the World Series 

The National and American Leagues operated under essentially identical rules until 1973, when the American League adopted the designated hitter (DH) rule, allowing its teams to use another hitter to bat in place of the (usually) weak-hitting pitcher.  The National League did not adopt the DH rule.  This presented a problem for the World Series, whose two contestants would now be playing their regular-season games under different rules. From 1973 to 1975, the World Series did not include a DH. Starting in 1976, the World Series allowed for the use of a DH in even-numbered years only. 

The Cincinnati Reds swept the 1976 Series in four games, using the same nine-man lineup in each contest. Dan Driessen was the Reds' DH during the series, thereby becoming the National League's first designated hitter. From 1986 to 2019, and in 2021, the DH in the World Series was used only in games played at American League parks, and pitchers were required to bat in games played at National League parks. In 2020, and starting in 2022, the DH was adopted by the National League on a regular basis.

1980s

1984: Anderson becomes first to win in both leagues 
The 1984 Detroit Tigers gained distinction as just the third team in major league history (after the 1927 New York Yankees and 1955 Brooklyn Dodgers) to lead a season wire-to-wire, from opening day through their World Series victory. In the process, Tigers skipper Sparky Anderson became the first manager to win a World Series title in both leagues, having previously won in 1975 and 1976 with the Cincinnati Reds.

1985: Umpiring controversy 
The 1985 Kansas City Royals won the series four games to three over the St. Louis Cardinals.  The key turning point of the series was a Kansas City win in Game Six aided by a controversial call by Don Denkinger at first base.  Kansas City later won Game Seven 11–0 to take the series.

1987: Twins First World Series champion to win every home game 
The 1987 Minnesota Twins became the first team in the history of the World Series to win the championship by winning all 4 games they hosted when they defeated the St. Louis Cardinals. They repeated this 4 years later in 1991 when they defeated the Atlanta Braves.

1988: Kirk Gibson's home run 

The 1988 World Series is remembered for the iconic home run by the Los Angeles Dodgers' Kirk Gibson with two outs in the bottom of the ninth inning of Game 1.  The Dodgers were huge underdogs against the 104-win Oakland Athletics, who had swept the Boston Red Sox in the ALCS.  Baseball's top relief pitcher, Dennis Eckersley, closed out all four games in the ALCS, and he appeared ready to do the same in Game 1 against a Dodgers team trailing 4–3 in the ninth.  

After getting the first two outs, Eckersley walked Mike Davis of the Dodgers, who were playing without Gibson, their best position player and the NL MVP.  Gibson had injured himself in the NLCS and was expected to miss the entire World Series.  Yet, despite not being able to walk without a noticeable limp, Gibson surprised all in attendance at Dodger Stadium (and all watching on TV) by pinch-hitting.  After two quick strikes and then working the count full, Gibson hit a home run to right, inspiring iconic pronouncements by two legendary broadcasters calling the game, Vin Scully (on TV) and Jack Buck (on radio).  

On NBC, as Gibson limped around the bases, Scully famously exclaimed, "The impossible has happened!" and on radio, Buck equally famously exclaimed, "I don't believe what I just saw!" Gibson's home run set the tone for the series, as the Dodgers went on to beat the A's 4 games to 1.  The severity of Gibson's injury prevented him from playing in any of the remaining games.

1989: Earthquake 

When the 1989 World Series began, it was notable chiefly for being the first-ever World Series matchup between the two San Francisco Bay Area teams, the San Francisco Giants and Oakland Athletics. Oakland won the first two games at home, and the two teams crossed the bridge to San Francisco to play Game 3 on Tuesday, October 17. ABC's broadcast of Game 3 began at 5 pm local time, approximately 30 minutes before the first pitch was scheduled. At 5:04, while broadcasters Al Michaels and Tim McCarver were narrating highlights and the teams were warming up, the Loma Prieta earthquake occurred (having a surface-wave magnitude of 7.1 with an epicenter ten miles (16 km) northeast of Santa Cruz, California). 

The earthquake caused substantial property and economic damage in the Bay Area and killed 63 people. Television viewers saw the video signal deteriorate and heard Michaels say "I'll tell you what, we're having an earth--" before the feed from Candlestick Park was lost. Fans filing into the stadium saw Candlestick sway visibly during the quake. Television coverage later resumed, using backup generators, with Michaels becoming a news reporter on the unfolding disaster. Approximately 30 minutes after the earthquake, Commissioner Fay Vincent ordered the game to be postponed. Fans, workers, and the teams evacuated a blacked-out (although still sunlit) Candlestick. Game 3 was finally played on October 27, and Oakland won that day and the next to complete a four-game sweep.

1990s

1991: "The Greatest of All Time" 

The 1991 World Series saw the Minnesota Twins defeating the Atlanta Braves four games to three to win the championship. ESPN selected it as the "Greatest of All Time" in their "World Series 100th Anniversary" countdown, with five of its games being decided by a single run, four games decided in the final at-bat and three games going into extra innings. The series was also notable for both participants having finished last in their divisions the year prior; no last place team before had ever finished first, let alone reached the World Series, the following year.

The series-deciding seventh game was a scoreless tie (0–0) through the regular nine innings, and went into extra innings; Minnesota won by a score of 1–0 in the 10th inning, after their starting pitcher, Jack Morris, pitched a complete 10 inning shutout 7th game. (Morris was named Most Valuable Player for the Series.)

With 69 innings in total, the 1991 World Series shares the record for longest seven-game World Series ever, in terms of innings, with the 1924 World Series.

1992–1993: The World Series enters Canada 

World Series games were contested outside of the United States for the first time in 1992, with the Toronto Blue Jays defeating the Atlanta Braves in six games. The World Series returned to Canada in 1993, with the Blue Jays victorious again, this time against the Philadelphia Phillies in six games. No other Series has featured a team from outside of the United States. Toronto is the only expansion team to win successive World Series titles. 

The 1993 World Series was also notable for being only the second championship concluded by a walk-off home run and the first concluded by a come-from-behind homer, after Joe Carter's three-run shot in the bottom of the ninth inning sealed an 8–6 Toronto win in Game 6. The first Series to end with a homer was the 1960 World Series, when Bill Mazeroski hit a ninth-inning solo shot in Game 7 to win the championship for the Pittsburgh Pirates over the New York Yankees.

1994: League Division Series 
In 1994, each league was restructured into three divisions, with the three division winners and the newly introduced wild card winner advancing to a best-of-five playoff round (the "division series"), the National League Division Series (NLDS) and American League Division Series (ALDS).  The team with the best league record is matched against the wild card team unless they are in the same division, in which case, the team with the second-best record plays against the wild card winner. 

The remaining two division winners are pitted against each other. The winners of the series in the first round advance to the best-of-seven NLCS and ALCS. Due to a players' strike, however, the NLDS and ALDS were not played until 1995.  Beginning in 1998, home-field advantage was given to the team with the better regular-season record, with the exception that the Wild Card team cannot get home-field advantage.

1994–1995 strike 

After the boycott of 1904, the World Series was played every year until 1994 despite World War I, the global influenza pandemic of 1918–1919, the Great Depression of the 1930s, America's involvement in World War II, and even an earthquake in the host cities of the 1989 World Series. A breakdown in collective bargaining led to a strike in August 1994 and the eventual cancellation of the rest of the season, including the playoffs.

As the labor talks began, baseball franchise owners demanded a salary cap in order to limit payrolls (while tying revenue-sharing to it), the elimination of salary arbitration, and other various demands, which would have included using replacement players to cross picket lines. The Major League Baseball Players Association (MLBPA) refused to agree to limit payrolls, noting that the responsibility for high payrolls lay with those owners who were voluntarily offering contracts while working with a de facto commissioner in Bud Selig (who was the chairman of the Executive Council for the league), who had replaced Fay Vincent when he was forced out in 1992 (Selig did not become a full-time commissioner until 1998). 

The previous collective bargaining agreement expired on December 31, 1993, and baseball began the 1994 season without a new agreement. Owners and players negotiated as the season progressed, but owners refused to give up the idea of a salary cap and players refused to accept one. On August 12, 1994, the players went on strike. After a month passed with no progress in the labor talks, Selig canceled the rest of the 1994 season and the postseason on September 14. The World Series was not played for the first time in 90 years. The Montreal Expos, now the Washington Nationals, were the best team in baseball at the time of the stoppage, with a record of 74–40.

The labor dispute lasted into the spring of 1995, with owners beginning spring training with replacement players. However, the MLBPA returned to work on April 2, 1995, after a federal judge, Sonia Sotomayor, ruled that the owners had engaged in unfair labor practices. The season started on April 25 and the 1995 World Series was played as scheduled, with the Atlanta Braves beating Cleveland Indians four games to two.

2000s

Early 2000s 

The 2000 New York Yankees faced the Mets in the first World Series played entirely in New York since 1956. The Yankees defeated the Mets four games to one to win their 26th World Series Championship. Shortstop Derek Jeter won the World Series' Most Valuable Player award after winning the Most Valuable Player award in the All-Star Game in the same year.

The 2001 World Series was the first World Series to end in November, due to the week-long delay in the regular season after the September 11 attacks. Game 4 had begun on Oct. 31 but went into extra innings and ended early on the morning of Nov. 1, the first time the Series had been played in November. Yankee shortstop Derek Jeter won the game with a 10th inning walk-off home run and was dubbed "Mr. November" by elements of the media echoing the media's designation of Reggie Jackson as "Mr. October" for his slugging achievements during the 1977 World Series. 

The Boston Red Sox broke their 86-year drought, known as the Curse of the Bambino, defeating the Yankees in the 2004 ALCS after losing the first three games, and then defeating the St. Louis Cardinals in the 2004 World Series. With the 2006 World Series victory by the Cardinals, Tony La Russa became the second manager to win a World Series in both the American and National Leagues. Other notable World Series victories of the decade include the Arizona Diamondbacks, in only their fourth season of play, over the Yankees in 2001, The Anaheim Angels in 2002, the Chicago White Sox in 2005, and the Philadelphia Phillies in 2008.

All-Star Game and home-field advantage (2003–2016) 
Prior to 2003, home-field advantage in the World Series alternated from year to year between the NL and AL. After the 2002 Major League Baseball All-Star Game ended in a tie, MLB decided to award home-field advantage in the World Series to the winner of the All-Star Game. Originally implemented as a two-year trial from 2003 to 2004, the practice was extended.

The American League had won every All-Star Game since this change until 2010 and thus enjoyed home-field advantage from 2002, when it also had home-field advantage based on the alternating schedule, through 2009. From 2003 to 2010, the AL and NL had each won the World Series four times, but none of them had gone the full seven games. Since then, the 2011, 2014, 2016, 2017, and 2019 World Series have gone the full seven games.

This rule was subject to debate, with various writers feeling that home-field advantage should be decided based on the regular season records of the participants, not on an exhibition game played several months earlier. Some writers especially questioned the integrity of this rule after the 2014 All-Star Game, when St. Louis Cardinals pitcher Adam Wainwright suggested that he intentionally gave Derek Jeter some easy pitches to hit in the New York Yankees' shortstop's final All-Star appearance before he retired at the end of that season.

As Bob Ryan of The Boston Globe wrote in July 2015 about the rule:

However, in seven of the last nine seasons, home-field advantage did not decide World Series games: Between 2014 and 2022, the home team did not win the deciding game of a World Series on their own home field, although the 2020 edition, played on a neutral site due to the COVID-19 pandemic, was won by the designated home team (in this case the team that batted second), the Los Angeles Dodgers, so technically speaking it was the first Series won by the home team since 2013.  The 2022 edition was won in 6 games by the eventual designated home team, the Houston Astros, making them the first such team since 2013 to actually win the deciding game of a World Series on their own home field, in this case Minute Maid Park.

2010s 

The San Francisco Giants won the World Series in 2010, 2012, and 2014 while failing to qualify to play in the postseason in the intervening seasons.

The Texas Rangers, who lost in the 2010 World Series, were twice only one strike away from winning their first World Series title in 2011, but the St. Louis Cardinals' David Freese, the eventual Series MVP, drove in both the tying and winning runs late in Game 6 to force a Game 7.

In 2012, the Wild Card game was added. This game, one from each league, was played between the best two teams in the league, aside from the division winner. The San Francisco Giants swept the Detroit Tigers in that year's World Series.

In 2013, the Boston Red Sox won their first World Series of the 2010s by defeating the St. Louis Cardinals in six games. They won the final game at Fenway Park, clinching the championship at home for the first time since 1918.

The Kansas City Royals reached the World Series in 2014, which was their first appearance in the postseason since winning the series in 1985. At the time, it was the longest postseason drought in baseball. They lost in seven games to the San Francisco Giants. The following season, the Royals finished with the American League's best record and won a second consecutive American League pennant. They defeated the New York Mets in the World Series in five games, capturing their first title in 30 years. The 2015 contest was the first time that two expansion clubs met in the series.

In 2016, the Chicago Cubs ended their 108-year long drought without a World Series title by defeating the Cleveland Indians in seven games, rallying from a 3–1 Series deficit in the process. That extended Cleveland's World Series title drought to 68 years and counting – the Indians last won the Series in 1948 – now the longest title drought in the major leagues.

Beginning in 2017, home-field advantage in the World Series was awarded to the league champion team with the better regular-season win–loss record. If both league champions have the same record, the tie-breaker is a head-to-head record, and if that does not resolve it, the second tie-breaker is the best divisional record.

The Houston Astros won the 2017 World Series in seven games against the Los Angeles Dodgers on November 1, 2017, winning their first World Series since their creation in 1962.  That title came under controversy two years later in the aftermath of Houston Astros sign stealing scandal, which implicated the team in engaging in an elaborate scheme involving the use of technology to steal the pitching signs of opposing teams during the 2017 and 2018 seasons.

The Boston Red Sox won the 2018 World Series, defeating the Los Angeles Dodgers in five games for their fourth title since 2004. Major League Baseball would come to find out that the Red Sox were also in a sign stealing scandal, which involved video replay in the booth to relay signs to the dugout.

In 2019, the Washington Nationals defeated the Houston Astros in seven games. It was the first seven-game World Series in which the road team won every game. The Nationals achieved a couple of historical milestones: becoming the first team to win the World Series without winning a home game and bringing the title back to the capital for the first time since 1924.

With the Nationals' appearance in the World Series in 2019, the Seattle Mariners are left as the only active MLB franchise to never appear in the World Series.

2020s 

In 2020, the Los Angeles Dodgers defeated the Tampa Bay Rays in six games to win their first World Series since 1988, and their seventh championship in franchise history, during a season that was shortened to 60 games by the COVID-19 pandemic. Starting with the Division Series, all postseason games were played at neutral venues, with the World Series being held at Globe Life Field, the home stadium of the Texas Rangers.

The Houston Astros received home-field advantage in both the 2021 World Series and the 2022 World Series. In 2021, they lost to the Atlanta Braves in six games, with Jorge Soler winning MVP Honors. In 2022, they won over the Philadelphia Phillies in six games, where rookie Jeremy Peña took home MVP, Houston manager Dusty Baker won his first World Series in his 25 years of being a manager, and four pitchers pitched a combined no-hitter in Game 4.

Modern World Series appearances by franchise

World Series record by team or franchise, 1903–present 

Notes
American League (AL) teams have won 67 of the 118 World Series played (56.8%). The New York Yankees have won the World Series the most times with 27 championships, accounting for 23.1% of all series played and 40.9% of the wins by American League teams. The Yankees have also been the American League's representative in the World Series the most times, with 40 total appearances. The St. Louis Cardinals have won 11 World Series, second-most among all 30 teams and most among National League franchises, accounting for 9.4% of all series played and 21.6% of the 51 National League victories. However, the Brooklyn/Los Angeles Dodgers have been the National League's representative in the World Series the most times, with 21 total appearances. The Dodgers' 14 World Series losses are the most by any team, while the Yankees' 13 losses are the most among AL teams.

The Yankees and the Dodgers have faced off against each other the most times, with eleven total contests between the two franchises.  The Yankees won eight of those eleven contests, although the Dodgers defeated the Yankees in their last World Series matchup in 1981.

When the first modern World Series was played in 1903, there were eight teams in each league. These 16 franchises, all of which are still in existence, have each won at least two World Series titles.

The number of teams was unchanged until 1961, with fourteen expansion teams joining MLB since then, all of which except the Seattle Mariners have appeared in at least one World Series. Of the 26 Series in which at least one expansion team has played, including two Series (2015 and 2019) in which both teams were expansion teams, expansion teams have won 11 of them, which is 42.3% of all series in which an expansion team played and 9.4% of all 117 series played since 1903. In 2015, the first World Series featuring only expansion teams was played between the Kansas City Royals and New York Mets.

Television coverage and ratings 

When the World Series was first broadcast on television in 1947, it was only televised to a few surrounding areas via coaxial inter-connected stations: New York City (WNBT); Philadelphia (WPTZ); Schenectady/Albany, New York (WRGB); Washington, D.C. (WNBW) and surrounding suburbs/environs. In , games in Boston were only seen in the Northeast. Meanwhile, games in Cleveland were only seen in the Midwest and Pittsburgh. The games were open to all channels with a network affiliation. 

In all, the 1948 World Series was televised to fans in seven Midwestern cities: Cleveland, Chicago, Detroit, Milwaukee, St. Louis, and Toledo. By , World Series games could be seen east of the Mississippi River. The games were open to all channels with a network affiliation. 

By , World Series games could be seen in most of the country, but not all.  marked the first time that the World Series was televised coast to coast.  marked the first time that the World Series was televised in color.

Sponsorship
As part of a multiyear partnership that began in 2017, the Internet television service YouTube TV became the presenting sponsor of the World Series.

Also in 2022, credit card provider Capital One become the presenting sponsor of the World Series as part of the new multi-year agreement.

Naming and international participation 

Despite its name, the World Series remains solely the championship of the Major League Baseball teams in the United States and Canada, although MLB, its players, and North American media sometimes informally refer to World Series winners as "world champions of baseball".

The United States, Canada, and Mexico (Liga Méxicana de Béisbol, established 1925) were the only professional baseball countries until a few decades into the 20th century. The first Japanese professional baseball efforts began in 1920. The current Japanese leagues date from the late 1940s (after World War II). Various Latin American leagues also formed around that time.

By the 1990s, baseball was played at a highly skilled level in many countries. Reaching North America's high-salary major leagues is the goal of many of the best players around the world, which gives a strong international flavor to the Series. Many talented players from Latin America, the Caribbean, the Pacific Rim, and elsewhere now play in the majors. One notable exception is Cuban citizens, because of the political tensions between the US and Cuba since 1959. Yet a number of Cuba's finest ballplayers have still managed to defect to the United States over the past half-century to play in the American professional leagues. 

Japanese professional players also have a difficult time coming to the North American leagues. They become free agents only after nine years playing service in the Nippon Professional Baseball (Japan's premier baseball league), although their Japanese teams may at any time "post" them for bids from MLB teams, which commonly happens at the player's request.

Several tournaments feature teams composed only of players from one country, similar to national teams in other sports. The World Baseball Classic, sponsored by Major League Baseball and sanctioned by the sport's world governing body, the World Baseball Softball Confederation (WBSC), uses a format similar to the FIFA World Cup to promote competition between nations every four years. The WBSC has since added the Premier12, a tournament also involving national teams; the first event was held in 2015, and is planned to be held every four years (in the middle of the World Baseball Classic cycle). 

The World Baseball Classic is held in March and the Premier12 is held in November, allowing both events to feature top-level players from all nations. The predecessor to the WBSC as the sport's international governing body, the International Baseball Federation, also sponsored a Baseball World Cup to crown a world champion. However, because the World Cup was held during the Northern Hemisphere summer, during the playing season of almost all top-level leagues, its teams did not feature the best talent from each nation. 

As a result, baseball fans paid little or no attention to the World Cup and generally disregarded its results. The Caribbean Series features competition among the league champions from Mexico, Puerto Rico, the Dominican Republic, and Venezuela but unlike the FIFA Club World Cup, there is no club competition that features champions from all professional leagues across the world.

Image gallery

See also 

 AL pennant winners (1901–1968)
 AL Wild Card winners (since 1994)
 Americas Baseball Cup
 Asia Series
 Asian Baseball Championship
 Baseball at the Asian Games
 Baseball at the Central American and Caribbean Games
 Baseball at the Pan American Games
 Baseball at the Summer Olympics
 College World Series
 European Baseball Championship
 European Champion Cup Final Four
 European Cup (baseball)
 Home advantage
 Intercontinental Cup (International Baseball Federation (IBAF))
 Japan Series
 Korean Series
 Taiwan Series
 Little League World Series
 MLB division winners
 MLB postseason
 MLB postseason teams
 MLB rivalries
 NL pennant winners (1876–1968)
 NL Wild Card winners (since 1994)
 Negro World Series
 Women's Baseball World Cup
 World Series broadcasters
 World Series starting pitchers
 World Series television ratings

Notes

References 
 Ernest Lanigan, Baseball Cyclopedia, 1922, originally published by Baseball Magazine, available as a reprint from McFarland.
 
 
 Jordan A. Deutsch, Richard M. Cohen, David Neft, Roland T. Johnson, The Scrapbook History of Baseball, 1975, Bobbs-Merrill Company.
 
 
 Sporting News, Baseball Record Book and Baseball Guide, published annually since ca. 1941.

Further reading 
 Auf Der Mar, Nick.   "World Series Fever Offers No Relief from Agony of Stadium Envy." The [Montreal] Gazette.   October 30, 1991   (p. A2).
 Dickey, Glenn.   The History of the World Series Since 1903. New York: Stein and Day, 1984.
 Seymour, Harold.   Baseball: The Early Years. New York: Oxford University Press, 1960.   .
 Sutherland, Norman.   "Unhappy Start for Yankees." The [Glasgow] Herald.   March 20, 1999   (p. 9).
 Thorn, John et al.   Total Baseball. Kingston, New York: Total Sports Publishing, 2000.      (pp. 265–280).
 Minneapolis Star Tribune.   "Q & A on the News." October 29, 1999   (p. A2).

External links 

 
 Baseball Reference "postseason" page, listing every World Series, with links to play-by-play summaries of every game
 Sporting News: History of the World Series
 Baseball Almanac: World Series
 List of World Series Winning Rosters
 Coolest World Series teams ever
 ESPN Classic – Who's #1?: Best World Series

 
October sporting events
Recurring sporting events established in 1903
Annual events in Major League Baseball